Your Joy Is My Low is the debut EP by IAMX. It was released in 2004 in Austria, during IAMX's first tour.

The album was hand-numbered and limited to 222 copies.

Track listing
 "Your Joy Is My Low" 5:18
 "You Stick It In Me" 4:20
 "This Will Make You Love Again" 4:58
 "I Like Pretending" 5:16

References 

2004 debut EPs
IAMX albums